Liz Climo (born July 24, 1981) is an American cartoonist, animator, children's book author, and illustrator. She is best known for her webcomics, which she posts regularly to her website, The Little World of Liz, and her Rory the Dinosaur children's book series. She has also been animating on the television series The Simpsons since 2003.

Biography 

Climo was born and raised in Silicon Valley, where she attended San Jose State University (SJSU).  At SJSU, Climo applied for the university's animation program, but was not accepted.  Despite this setback, and before graduating from SJSU, Climo was hired as an animator on The Simpsons and moved to Los Angeles.

After working in the industry for a few years, Climo started a blog on Tumblr, where she occasionally posted comics and drawings. The blog eventually gained momentum, which led to her career in publishing. Since then, Climo has worked as a children's book author, has published calendars, and has a successful greeting card line featured at Target and Walmart.

Climo currently lives in Los Angeles with her husband and daughter.

Works

Author/Illustrator 
Rory the Dinosaur
Rory the Dinosaur: Me and My Dad (2015)
Rory the Dinosaur Wants a Pet (2016)
Rory the Dinosaur Needs a Christmas Tree (2017)
 Forthcoming Rory the Dinosaur title
The Little World of Liz Climo
The Little World of Liz Climo (2013)
Lobster is the Best Medicine (2015)
Best Bear Ever! (2018)
Please Don't Eat Me (2019)
You're Mom (2020)
You're Dad (2021)
You're Loved (2022)
I'm So Happy You're Here (2022)

Illustrator 

 You Don't Want A Unicorn!, Ame Dyckman (2017)
 Can Somebody Please Scratch My Back?, Jory John (2018)
 You Don't Want a Dragon!, Ame Dyckman (2020)
 First Day Critter Jitters, Jory John (2020)
 Summer Camp Critter Jitters, Jory John (2021)

Filmography

Film

Television

Reception 

Climo and her work have been featured by publications and websites including The Huffington Post, The Toast, The Daily Dot, HitFix, Flavorwire, and The National Post (Ontario). Her works have been translated into 8 languages, and she is a bestselling author in China.

School Library Journal calls Climo's debut book "a read-aloud option with broad appeal" and "an excellent addition for most collections." The Horn Book Guide to Children's and Young Adult Books affirms that "love between father and son abounds on each spread," while Kirkus Reviews adds that "readers will appreciate the clean design and the warm and humorous story; they'll hope Rory sets off again soon."

Rory the Dinosaur Wants a Pet, Climo's second book, has been called "a cheerfully absurd portrait of unconditional love" (Publishers Weekly), "a fun book to share with the very young either one-on-one or in small groups" (School Library Journal). School Library Journal praises Climo's "simple yet clear, colorful, and expressive" illustrations, while Kirkus Reviews lauds her "lighthearted approach" and describes the title as "an appealing read-aloud" with an "innocent silliness."

References

External links 
 The Little World of Liz
 Liz Climo on Tumblr
 
 Lambiek Comiclopedia article.

Writers from California
American comics artists
American female comics artists
American cartoonists
American women cartoonists
Animators from California
American women illustrators
American women animators
1981 births
Living people
San Jose State University alumni
21st-century American artists
21st-century American writers
21st-century American women artists
21st-century American women writers